Longitarsus ventricosus is a species of beetle in the subfamily Galerucinae that can be found in France and Northern Spain.

References

V
Beetles described in 1860
Beetles of Europe